Mark Anthony De La Rosa (born August 31, 1994) is an American mixed martial artist (MMA) who fights in the flyweight division. He competed in the  Ultimate Fighting Championship (UFC).

Background
De La Rosa was born in Fort Worth, Texas in the United States. He started training in jiu-jitsu at the age of 12 to lose weight and became a jiu-jitsu coach three years later before subsequently transitioning to MMA.

Mixed martial arts career

Early career 
De La Rosa began his professional MMA career in 2014. He was the Superior Combative Championships bantamweight champion and amassed a record of 9–1 prior to signing with the UFC.

Ultimate Fighting Championship
De La Rosa made his UFC debut on December 30, 2017, on UFC 219 against Tim Elliott. He lost the fight via a submission in round two.

De La Rosa's next fight came on July 14, 2018, at UFC Fight Night: dos Santos vs. Ivanov against Elias Garcia. He won the fight via a rear-naked choke submission in round two.

On November 10, 2018, De La Rosa faced Joby Sanchez at UFC Fight Night: The Korean Zombie vs. Rodríguez. He won the fight via unanimous decision.

De La Rosa faced Alex Perez in a bantamweight bout on March 30, 2019, at UFC on ESPN 2. He lost the fight via unanimous decision.

De La Rosa faced Kai Kara-France on August 31, 2019, at UFC Fight Night 157. He lost the fight via unanimous decision.

De La Rosa faced Raulian Paiva on February 15, 2020, at UFC Fight Night 167. He lost the fight via knockout in the second round.

De La Rosa faced Jordan Espinosa on June 13, 2020, at UFC on ESPN: Eye vs. Calvillo. He lost the fight via unanimous decision.

After his fourth straight loss, the UFC had announced that his contract had ended and he was not renewed.

Championships and accomplishments

Mixed martial arts
Superior Combative Championships
Superior Combative Championships Bantamweight Championship (One time)

Personal life 
De La Rosa is married to Montana De La Rosa, who is a UFC fighter. He is a stepfather to Montana's daughter named Zaylyn.

Mixed martial arts record

|-
|Loss
|align=center|11–5
|Jordan Espinosa
|Decision (unanimous)
|UFC on ESPN: Eye vs. Calvillo
|
|align=center|3
|align=center|5:00
|Las Vegas, Nevada, United States
|
|-
|Loss
|align=center|11–4
|Raulian Paiva
|KO (punches)
|UFC Fight Night: Anderson vs. Błachowicz 2 
|
|align=center|2
|align=center|4:42
|Rio Rancho, New Mexico, United States
|
|-
|Loss
|align=center|11–3
|Kai Kara-France
|Decision (unanimous)
|UFC Fight Night: Andrade vs. Zhang 
|
|align=center|3
|align=center|5:00
|Shenzhen, China
|
|-
|Loss
|align=center|11–2
|Alex Perez
|Decision (unanimous)
|UFC on ESPN: Barboza vs. Gaethje 
|
|align=center|3
|align=center|5:00
|Philadelphia, Pennsylvania, United States
|
|-
|Win
|align=center| 11–1
|Joby Sanchez
|Decision (split)
|UFC Fight Night: The Korean Zombie vs. Rodríguez
|
|align=center| 3
|align=center| 5:00
|Denver, Colorado, United States
|
|-
|Win
|align=center| 10–1
|Elias Garcia
|Submission (rear-naked choke)
|UFC Fight Night: dos Santos vs. Ivanov
|
|align=center| 2
|align=center| 2:00
|Boise, Idaho, United States
|
|-
|Loss
|align=center| 9–1
|Tim Elliott
|Submission (anaconda choke)
|UFC 219
|
|align=center| 2
|align=center| 1:41
|Las Vegas, Nevada, United States
|
|-
|Win
|align=center| 9–0
|Mahatma Chit-Bala Garcia Avalos
|Submission (rear-naked choke)
|Combate Americas 15
|
|align=center| 3
|align=center| 2:36
|Mexico City, Mexico
|
|-
|Win
|align=center| 8–0
|Ivan Hernandez Flores
|Submission (arm-triangle choke)
|Combate Americas 10
|
|align=center| 2
|align=center| 3:11
|Mexico City, Mexico
|
|-
|Win
|align=center| 7–0
|Arthur Oliveira
|Decision (unanimous)
|Superior Combative Championships
|
|align=center| 5
|align=center| 5:00
|Fort Worth, Texas, United States
|
|-
|Win
|align=center| 6–0
|Kashiff Solarin
|Submission (rear-naked choke)
|Dominion Warrior Tri Combat
|
|align=center| 1
|align=center| 2:58
|Dallas, Texas, United States
|
|-
|Win
|align=center| 5–0
|Joseph Sandoval
|Submission (rear-naked choke)
|Xtreme Knockout 28
|
|align=center| 1
|align=center| 1:25
|Dallas, Texas, United States
|
|-
|Win
|align=center| 4–0
|Xavier Siller
|TKO (punches)
|Premier Fight Series 4
|
|align=center| 2
|align=center| 4:22
|Midland, Texas, United States
|
|-
|Win
|align=center| 3–0
|Keeton Gorton
|Decision (split)
|Legacy Fighting Championship 38
|
|align=center| 3
|align=center| 5:00
|Allen, Texas, United States
|
|-
|Win
|align=center| 2–0
|Michael Brasher
|Decision (unanimous)
|Xtreme Knockout 23
|
|align=center| 3
|align=center| 3:00
|Arlington, Texas, United States
|
|-
|Win
|align=center| 1–0
|Marcus Huerta
|Submission (rear-naked choke)
|24/7 Entertainment 17
|
|align=center| 1
|align=center| 1:38
|Midland, Texas, United States
|
|-

See also
List of male mixed martial artists

References

External links
 

Living people
1994 births
Flyweight mixed martial artists
Bantamweight mixed martial artists
Mixed martial artists utilizing Brazilian jiu-jitsu
American practitioners of Brazilian jiu-jitsu
People awarded a black belt in Brazilian jiu-jitsu
American male mixed martial artists
People from Fort Worth, Texas
Mixed martial artists from Texas
Ultimate Fighting Championship male fighters